Events in the year 2021 in Ghana.

Incumbents
President: Nana Akufo-Addo 
Vice President: Mahamudu Bawumia

Events
Ongoing — COVID-19 pandemic in Ghana
7 January – 2020 Ghanaian general election: The Ghana Army steps in to put down a fight in Parliament. President Nana Akufo-Addo is sworn in for another term.
21 January – Police arrest 11 in a ″baby-harvesting″ scheme in Accra and Tema.
9 January – Parliament is forced to close for three weeks after 17 Members and 171 staff contract COVID-19.
24 February
600,000 doses of the Oxford–AstraZeneca COVID-19 vaccine arrive in Accra. This is the first vaccine shipment under the UN-sponsored COVAX plan. Ghana reports 81,215 cases of infection, 6,614 active cases, and 584 deaths.
The offices of ″LGBT+ Rights Ghana″ are closed by security forces.
26 February – 2021 Asafo-Akyem bus crash
20 May - 2021 Ghana gay arrests
11 June – During the 2021 United Nations Security Council Elections, Ghana was elected to serve a two-year term on the UN Security Council as a non-permanent member. Its term, starting in 2022, will mark the fourth time Ghana has sat on the Security Council.

Sports
2020–21 Ghana Premier League
24 August to 5 September – Ghana at the 2020 Summer Paralympics

Deaths

2 January – Sakib Bamba, religious leader, chief Imam of Ejura.
18 January – Joshua Kyeremeh, politician; kidney complications.
23 January – Abukari Gariba, 81, Olympic footballer (1968, 1972).
1 February – Joshua Hamidu, 85, military officer and diplomat, Chief of the Defence Staff (1978–1979), High Commissioner to Zambia (1978) and Nigeria (2003–2005).
9 February – Emmanuel Kojo Dadson, 68, actor (Love Brewed in the African Pot, Run Baby Run, Elmina).
11 February – George Benneh, 86, academic administrator and politician, Minister of Finance (1981) and Vice-Chancellor of the University of Ghana (1992–1996).
20 February – Rosamond Asiamah Nkansah, 91, police officer, first woman recruited into the Ghanaian force.
25 February – Bob Pixel, photographer; COVID-19.
4 March – DJ Adviser, disc jockey (Happy FM).
7 April – Emmanuel Evans-Anfom, physician and university administrator.

See also

African Continental Free Trade Area
COVID-19 pandemic in Africa

References

External links
Ghana prepares to bury ex-leader Rawlings as parties vie over legacy (by Marine Jeannin, AFP, January 23, 2021)

 
2020s in Ghana
Years of the 21st century in Ghana
Ghana
Ghana
2021 in Ghanaian sport